Mauro Marani (born 9 March 1975) is a former Sanmarinese international footballer who last played as a defender for Murata.

Career

Club career
Marani has played club football for Cosmos, Juvenes/Dogana, Murata and Pennarossa.

International career
Marani played in 13 FIFA World Cup qualifying matches.

Marani was sent off in an international match on 15 October 2008, against Northern Ireland, for striking opposition player Michael O'Connor.

References

1975 births
Living people
Sammarinese footballers
San Marino international footballers
Association football defenders